Perry Pirkkanen is an American actor. He is best known for starring in the 1980 Italian cannibal film Cannibal Holocaust. In the movie he is erroneously credited as 'Perry Pirkanen'. Pirkkanen, then a student at New York City's Actors Studio, was hired by director Ruggero Deodato who was looking for unknown actors to play the film's four protagonists. In the film, he was in an infamous scene where he butchered a large turtle. He is even seen holding the turtle's head next to his mouth. However, after filming the scene, he cried and had an emotional breakdown off camera.

So realistic was the film that shortly after it was released, its director Ruggero Deodato was indicted for the actors' murder. In the film, he was seen getting his penis cut off, getting decapitated, and his body being eaten by the natives next to his head. The actors had signed contracts to stay out of the media for a year in order to fuel rumours that the film was a snuff movie. The court was only convinced that they were alive when the contracts were cancelled and the actors appeared on a television show as proof.

He has also starred in Perfect Crime as the original inspector Ascher. 

He has moved away from public life and does not want to be in tv or movies since then, and very little to none is known about his personal life or what happened to him after the movies he stared in.

Filmography
Cannibal Holocaust (1980) - Jack Anders
City of the Living Dead (1980) - The Blonde Gravedigger
Cannibal Ferox (1981) - Paul 
Cruel Jaws (1995) - (Unconfirmed) (Uncredited)

See also
Carl Gabriel Yorke
Francesca Ciardi
Luca Barbareschi

References

External links

American people of Finnish descent

Year of birth missing (living people)
Living people